Robert John Staak (born December 22, 1947 in Darien, Connecticut) is a former American college basketball and professional basketball coach.

Early life
Staak attended Darien High School in Darien, Connecticut, where he played basketball and became the all-time leading scorer  with 1,166 points, a mark that still stands. He graduated in 1966, and he was recruited by about 100 universities.

College career
Staak attended St. John's University as a freshman, taking business courses. However, living off-campus didn't provide the atmosphere he was looking for, and when he decided that he wanted to someday be a basketball coach and St. John's didn't offer the academic concentration he sought, he transferred to the University of Connecticut. Due to transfer rules, he had to sit out a year before playing basketball for UConn. He played three years of varsity basketball for the Huskies, ending his career as the school's fourth all-time leading scorer. He was named All-New England and All-Yankee Conference. A two-year co-captain, he was named UConn's Most Valuable Player his senior year and he earned the UConn Club Award as the Outstanding Senior Athlete. He graduated in 1971.

Professional career
After graduating, he signed to play professional basketball with the Pittsburgh Condors of the American Basketball Association (ABA), but was cut in preseason. He returned to Connecticut and played in the New York State Pro League on weekends for a year while also coaching at East Hartford High School. The following year, he was invited to tryout for the ABA's Kentucky Colonels, but they had a contract dispute and Staak decided to end his playing career.

Coaching career
Staak became an assistant coach at UConn for two years under his college coach Dee Rowe. He then served as an assistant for one season at the College of William and Mary in Virginia. He then served as an assistant at the Ivy League's University of Pennsylvania under future Hall-of-Famer Chuck Daly. In 1979, the Quakers advanced to the NCAA Final Four.

After their tournament run, Staak got his first college basketball head coaching job when he was named head coach/athletic director at Xavier University in Cincinnati, where he coached from 1979 to 1985. Staak compiled an 88-86 record (.506) in six seasons as the Musketeers head coach. He worked to rebuild, compiling a 28-54 (.341) record in his first three years and a 60-32 (.652) record in his final three years.

He then became head coach at Wake Forest University from 1985 to 1989, where his teams posted a 45-69 record in four seasons.

For the next 12 seasons he was an assistant coach and/or scout in the National Basketball Association (NBA), for the Los Angeles Clippers, Miami Heat, Washington Bullets, Golden State Warriors, and Memphis Grizzlies. He spent two years (2003–05) as a referee observer with the NBA followed by one season as a scout for the Boston Celtics. He then spent seven-plus seasons with the Orlando Magic from January 2005 to July 2012.

Personal life
Staak was inducted into the Xavier Athletic Hall of Fame in 1990, the Greater Cincinnati Basketball Hall of Fame in 2002, the New England Basketball Hall of Fame in 2009, and the UConn Fairfield County Sports Hall of Fame in 2010.

He is married to Donna (Durant) and Staak has a grown son and stepdaughter.

References

External links
 Career coaching statistics from Basketball-Reference.com

1947 births
Living people
American expatriate basketball people in Canada
American men's basketball coaches
American men's basketball players
Basketball coaches from Connecticut
Basketball players from Connecticut
Golden State Warriors assistant coaches
Los Angeles Clippers assistant coaches
Memphis Grizzlies assistant coaches
Miami Heat assistant coaches
Penn Quakers men's basketball coaches
People from Darien, Connecticut
Shooting guards
Small forwards
UConn Huskies men's basketball coaches
UConn Huskies men's basketball players
Vancouver Grizzlies assistant coaches
Wake Forest Demon Deacons men's basketball coaches
Washington Bullets assistant coaches
Washington Bullets head coaches
William & Mary Tribe men's basketball coaches
Xavier Musketeers athletic directors
Xavier Musketeers men's basketball coaches
Darien High School alumni